Rollo is a department or commune of Bam Province in north-western Burkina Faso. Its capital lies at the town of Rollo. According to the 1996 census the department has a total population of 25,631. In 2007, as part of political decentralisation, new Mayors were elected to replace the existing local politicians. Issa Ouermi was elected mayor of the Rollo Department.

Towns and villages
Boulguin
Gondékoubé
Ibi 
Igondéga 
Kangaré 
Kangaré-Foulbé 
Kobséré 
Koulwéogo 
Lourfa 
Ouenné 
Ouittenga 
Pogoro
Pogoro-Foulbé
Rollo
Tampouï 
Toéssin
Toéssin-Foulbé

References

Departments of Burkina Faso
Bam Province